Albatross Island may refer to:
 Albatross Island (South Georgia)
 Albatross Island (Tasmania)
 Albatross Island (St. Brandon), in the St. Brandon archipelago, in the outer islands of Mauritius
 Albatross Island, an islet just south of Thistle Island in South Australia
 Albatross Island, one of the Penguin Islands off the Namibian coast
 Île Albatross, near Savanne, southern Mauritius
 The former name of West Point Island, Falkland Islands